Linden Keith King was a linebacker who played thirteen seasons in the NFL — nine for the San Diego Chargers, and four for the Los Angeles Raiders. He played college football at Colorado State as a defensive back and linebacker. He was inducted to the Colorado State University Athletics Hall of Fame in 1998.

Linden played in the North-South college all-star game and the Senior bowl. He was drafted in the 3rd round to San Diego and played as a strong safety and Special team player until he was switched to OLB in 1979. He became a starter in 1980 and played at the LOLB position till his release in 1986. His downtime was short however and he was on the field with the LA Raiders within a week of his departure. Linden became a starter two games into the 86 season and was the starting LOLB till his retirement in 1990
He also was featured on Techmo Bowl.

1955 births
Living people
San Diego Chargers players
Los Angeles Raiders players
Colorado State Rams football players
American football linebackers